The Dakotas is the region that combines the US states of North and South Dakota.

The Dakotas may also refer to:
 The Dakotas, the former Dakota Territory in the US 
 The Dakotas (TV series)
 The Dakotas (band)

See also 
 The Dakota, New York City apartment building complex 
 Dakota (disambiguation)
 North Dakota (disambiguation)
 South Dakota (disambiguation)